Tegostoma subterminalis is a moth in the family Crambidae. It was described by George Hampson in 1918. It is found in South Africa and Namibia.

References

Odontiini
Moths described in 1918
Moths of Africa
Taxa named by George Hampson